Abdul Rahman Saleh (born 1 April 1941 in Pekalongan). He was Attorney General of Indonesia for the period 2004-2007. He graduated from Gadjah Mada University.

External links
 Profile at TokohIndonesia
 Profile at Kejaksaan Agung

1941 births
Attorneys General of Indonesia
Government ministers of Indonesia
Indonesian Muslims
Javanese people
Living people
Gadjah Mada University alumni
People from Pekalongan
University of Indonesia alumni